Albania was represented by three athletes at the 2012 European Athletics Championships in Helsinki, Finland.

Results

Men

Field

Women

Track

References
Official website

Nations at the 2012 European Athletics Championships
2012
European Athletics Championships